Alderney Bird Observatory is a bird observatory on the island of Alderney, in the Channel Islands. It was setup in March 2016, with the logistical support of the Alderney Wildlife Trust to study bird migration and the island's seabird colonies. Progressed to become and independent company 'Alderney Bird Obervatory Ltd' in April 2019, a Channel Islands registered company and charity. Became the 20th accredited bird observatory in the Biritsh Isles at a recent meeting of the Bird Observatories Council. The first observatory was Skokholm, Pembrokeshire, Wales which opened in 1933.

The observatory was featured on the BBC's Countryfile on 15 May 2016. It became an independent company and registered charity in 2019.

In its first year the observatory recorded 180 species including five new to the island, and shows the importance of Alderney as a ″stop-over″ for migrant birds. Thirteen thousand birds were ringed including 777 storm petrel (Hydrobates pelagicus) and 500 gannet (Morus bassanus).

References

Alderney
Bird observatories
Organisations based in Alderney
Organizations established in 2016